Fagner Ironi Daponte (born 18 October 1990, in Santo Ângelo), known as Alemão, is a Brazilian footballer who plays as defender for Operário-PR.

Career statistics

Honours 
Avaí
Campeonato Catarinense: 2021

References

External links

1990 births
Living people
Brazilian footballers
Tanabi Esporte Clube players
Esporte Clube Internacional de Lages players
Clube Atlético Hermann Aichinger players
Grêmio Esportivo Juventus players
Associação Chapecoense de Futebol players
Operário Ferroviário Esporte Clube players
Brusque Futebol Clube players
Avaí FC players
Al-Hazem F.C. players
Campeonato Brasileiro Série A players
Campeonato Brasileiro Série B players
Campeonato Brasileiro Série D players
Saudi Professional League players
Expatriate footballers in Saudi Arabia
Brazilian expatriate sportspeople in Saudi Arabia
Association football fullbacks